The 2016 San Francisco 49ers season was the franchise's 67th season in the National Football League (NFL), the 71st overall, the third playing its home games at Levi's Stadium, and the only season under head coach Chip Kelly. The season saw the 49ers attempting to rebound from their 5–11 record the previous year, but finished 2–14, with their only wins coming against their division rival Los Angeles Rams. The 49ers also nearly became the first team (and only the second since the AFL–NFL Merger in 1970) since the 2001 Carolina Panthers to win their opener and lose the remainder of their games, prior to the 49ers' Week 16 win over the Rams. The 49ers' record was their worst since 2004, when they also finished 2–14 (both wins that season were against the Arizona Cardinals). The 49ers' 1–7 home record tied the worst home record in franchise history (not including the strike-shortened 1982 season). As a result, the 49ers fired Kelly and general manager Trent Baalke.

The 49ers defense also set an NFL record by allowing a 100-yard rusher in seven straight games and easily finished last in the league in rush defense.

Offseason

Coaching changes
After the 2015 season ended, the 49ers fired Jim Tomsula as head coach. On January 14, 2016, the 49ers hired Chip Kelly as their head coach. Kelly had spent the previous three seasons as head coach for the Philadelphia Eagles and had been fired after a disappointing 7–9 Eagles season.

Roster changes

Free agency
The 49ers entered free agency with the following:

Signings

Departures

Draft

Notes
 The 49ers traded their second-, fourth- and sixth-round selection (Nos. 37, 105 and 178 overall) to the Kansas City Chiefs in exchange for their first- and seventh-round selection (Nos. 28 and 249 overall).
 The 49ers acquired an additional fifth-round selection as part of a trade that sent their 2015 first-round selection to the San Diego Chargers.
 The 49ers acquired a sixth-round selection in a trade that sent their 2015 seventh-round selection to the Dallas Cowboys.
 The 49ers traded tight end Vernon Davis and their 2016 seventh-round selection to the Denver Broncos in exchange for the Broncos' 2016 sixth-round and 2017 sixth-round selections.

Undrafted free agents

Staff

Final roster

Preseason
The 49ers' preseason opponents and schedule were announced April 7, 2016.

Regular season

Schedule

Game summaries

Week 1: vs. Los Angeles Rams

Week 2: at Carolina Panthers

Week 3: at Seattle Seahawks

Week 4: vs. Dallas Cowboys

Week 5: vs. Arizona Cardinals

The 49ers wore their black alternate uniforms for this game as part of Color Rush.

Week 6: at Buffalo Bills

Days prior to Week 6, Head Coach Chip Kelly confirmed that quarterback Colin Kaepernick would start in place of Blaine Gabbert. This was Kaepernick's first start of the season.

Week 7: vs. Tampa Bay Buccaneers

Week 9: vs. New Orleans Saints

Week 10: at Arizona Cardinals

Week 11: vs. New England Patriots

Week 12: at Miami Dolphins

With the loss, the 49ers were mathematically eliminated from postseason contention for the third consecutive season. An attempted rally by the 49ers was stopped short of the end zone in the final seconds.

Week 13: at Chicago Bears

Week 14: vs. New York Jets

Week 15: at Atlanta Falcons

Week 16: at Los Angeles Rams

With the win, the 49ers snapped their 13-game losing streak and swept the Rams on the season, while going 0–13 against the rest of the league. With the Cleveland Browns standing 0–14 before this week, the 49ers win also ended the possibility of two teams finishing 1–15 for the first time, or becoming the first team since the 2001 Carolina Panthers to win their opener and lose the remainder of their games.

Week 17: vs. Seattle Seahawks

With the loss, the 49ers ended their season 2–14, their worst record since 2004. This was Colin Kaepernick's last game as a 49er.

Standings

Division

Conference

References

External links

 
 

San Francisco
San Francisco 49ers seasons
San Francisco 49ers
2016 in San Francisco